Namus (meaning "honor") is a 1925 silent drama film by Hamo Beknazarian, based on Alexander Shirvanzade's 1885 novel of the same name, which denounces the despotic rites and customs of Caucasian families. It is widely recognized as the first Armenian feature film.

History

Background
The Armenfilm studio was founded two years later, on 16 April 1923 as the State Cinema Organisation. Hamo Beknazarian, who was an actor prior to the 1917 Revolution, became actively involved in directing films after the Bolsheviks took over. Namus became his first notable work as a director.

Production and reaction
Namus was first premiered in Yerevan's Nairi Theatre on 13 April 1926. On 3 October of the same year, the film was presented in Moscow. A poster in Leningrad in 1926 called Namus the "biggest blockbuster of the season". When asked about the film, Hamo Beknazarian said "I wanted to set the power of custom in the pillory, that stupid force of the concept of "father's honor". The film had incredible success and brought Beknazarian to fame in the Soviet Union, which helped him in his later works, making him the founder of Armenian cinematography.

Restoration
The first attempt to restore the film was made in the 1960s, when it was voiced. In 2005 Namus was digitally restored by Franco-German network Arte. This version was first shown in Cinéma Le Balzac in Paris in November 2005 and then in Moscow Cinema in Yerevan in April 2010.

Plot
The story is set in the Caucasian city of Shemakhi, which was a provincial town in pre-revolutionary Russia. The love story involves Seyran, a son of a potter, who secretly meets with Susan, to whom he is engaged. The Armenian customs didn't tolerate this and strictly prohibited such behavior. When a neighbor catches them during one of their secret meetings, rumors of their actions spread around the neighborhood and her family decides to marry her to another man, in order to restore the family's honor. They choose Rustam, a rich merchant, for Susan to marry. Seyran slanders Susan by saying that he owns her. Rustam kills Susan, considered himself disgraced by Seyran's actions. At the end, Seyran commits suicide upon hearing about his lover's death.

Cast
Hovhannes Abelian as Barkhudar
Hasmik as Mariam
Olga Maysurian (hy) as Gyulnaz
Hrachia Nersisyan as Rustam
Avet Avetisian (hy, ru) as Hayrapet
Nina Manucharyan as Shpanik
Samvel Mkhrtchian (hy) as Seyran
Maria Shahbutian-Tatieva as Susan
Hambartsum Khachanyan as Badal
Levon Aleksanian as Susambar
Gayane Beknazarian (:hy: Գայանե Բեկնազարյան) as Sanam
Amasi Martirosyan as Smbat
Mikayel Garagash (hy) as shopkeeper
Husik Muradian (hy) as dancing child
Elizaveta Adamian as Mariam's friend
Tigran Shamirkhanian (hy) as a Zurna blower
Armen Gulakian (hy) in episodes
Pahare (hy) as pub owner

See also
Namus (the concept)
Cinema of Armenia

References

External links
 

1925 films
Soviet silent feature films
Armenian black-and-white films
Soviet black-and-white films
Films based on Armenian novels
Films set in Azerbaijan
Soviet-era Armenian films
Armenfilm films
Soviet drama films
1925 drama films
1926 drama films
1926 films
Armenian silent feature films
Silent drama films